Greer Ilene Gilman is an American author of fantasy stories.

Biography 

She was educated at Wellesley College and the University of Cambridge, where she studied on a Vida Dutton Scudder Fellowship. Her stories are noted for their dense prose style, which is strongly focused on native English roots, sometimes reminiscent of Gerard Manley Hopkins. Her characteristic themes are drawn from a mixture of North English and Scottish ballads and seasonal rituals, which she uses to create a complex mythology centered on the seasons and constellations of her fictional world of Cloud.

Her novel Moonwise, in which two women travel in a world they have created, won the Crawford Award for 1991. Her collection of three stories, Cloud & Ashes: Three Winter's Tales won the Tiptree Award in 2009, and has been shortlisted for the Mythopoeic Award in 2010. Both are published by Small Beer Press.  The novella "A Crowd of Bone"  published in Trampoline: an anthology won the 2004 World Fantasy Awards. Her work has also been published in Salon Fantastique, The Faces of Fantasy, and Mythic Delirium.  Her essay, "Girl, Implicated: The Child in the Labyrinth in the Fantastic" appeared in the Journal of the Fantastic in the Arts, vol.19 no. 2. Her chapter on "The Languages of the Fantastic" appears in the Cambridge Companion to Fantasy Literature.

References

External links
Official site
"A Crowd of Bone" by Greer Gilman, from the Trampoline anthology

20th-century American novelists
American fantasy writers
American women short story writers
American women novelists
Living people
Women science fiction and fantasy writers
World Fantasy Award-winning writers
20th-century American women writers
20th-century American short story writers
1951 births
21st-century American women
Wellesley College alumni